1,1,1-Tris(aminomethyl)ethane (TAME) is an organic compound with the formula CHC(CHNH). It is a colorless liquid.  It is classified as a polyamine tripodal ligand, i.e., capable of binding to metal ions through three sites and hence is a tridentate chelating ligand, occupying a face of the coordination polyhedron.

Preparation
TAME is synthesized by the Pd/C-catalyzed hydrogenation of 1,1,1-tris(azidomethyl)ethane. Although azides are potentially explosive, they are excellent and practical source of primary amines. The required tris(azidomethyl)ethane is obtained from the tritosylate by salt metathesis using sodium azide.  These two steps are:

3 NaN  +  CHC(CHOTs)   →   CHC(CHN)  +  3 NaOTs 
3 H  +  CHC(CHN)   →   CHC(CHNH)  +  3 N

Complexes of TAME
The tripodal TAME ligand coordinates facially to metal ions. This stereochemical feature has been exploited in the preparation of platinum(IV) cage complexes, e.g., [Pt(tame)], which is a six coordinate Pt(IV) complex. Platinum in its +4 oxidation state has a d configuration and is kinetically inert. For this reason the formation of [Pt(tame)] is initiated by installing TAME on a platinum(II) precursor.  The resulting square planar complex is oxidized with [PtCl] to produce the target Pt(IV) derivatives.

References

Polyamines
Tripodal ligands